The Sutlej Express is an Express train belonging to Northern Railway zone that runs between  and  in India. It is currently being operated with 14629/14630 train numbers on a daily basis.

Service

The 14629/Sutlej Express has average speed of 48 km/hr and covers 230 km in 5 h 40 m. The 14630/Sutlej Express has average speed of 49 km/hr and covers 230 km in 5 h 05 m.

Route and halts 

The important halts of the train are:

 SAS Nagar Mohali
 New Morinda Junction

Coach composition

The train has standard ICF rakes with max speed of 110 km/h. The train consists of 16 coaches:

 14 General Unreserved
 2 Seating cum Luggage Rake

Traction

The route is partially electrified yet so both trains are hauled by a Ludhiana Loco Shed-based WDM-3A diesel locomotive from Firozpur to Ludhiana and vice versa.

Rake sharing 

The train shares its rake with 14601/14602 Firozpur Cantonment–Shri Ganganagar Express and 54641/54642 Delhi–Firozpur Passenger.

Rake reversal

Train reverses its direction at Ludhiana Junction in vice versa.

See also 

 Firozpur Cantonment railway station
 Ludhiana Junction railway station
 Firozpur Cantonment–Shri Ganganagar Express
 Delhi–Firozpur Passenger
 Chandigarh–Firozpur Cantonment Express

Notes

References

External links 

 14629/Ludhiana Firozpur Sutlej Express
 14630/Firozpur Ludhiana Sutlej Express

Transport in Firozpur
Transport in Ludhiana
Named passenger trains of India
Rail transport in Punjab, India
Express trains in India